Sir Ivor Algernon Atkins (29 November 1869 – 26 November 1953) was the choirmaster and organist at Worcester Cathedral from 1897 to 1950, as well as a composer of songs, church music, service settings and anthems. He is best known for editing Allegri's Miserere with the famous top-C part for the treble. He is also well known for "The Three Kings", an arrangement of a song by Peter Cornelius as a choral work for Epiphany.

Born into a Welsh musical family at Llandaff, Atkins graduated with a bachelor of music degree from The Queen's College, Oxford in 1892, and subsequently obtained a Doctorate in Music (Oxford). He was assistant organist of Hereford Cathedral (1890-1893) and organist of St Laurence Church, Ludlow from 1893 to 1897. He directed the triennial Three Choirs Festival from his appointment at Worcester in 1897 through until 1948 (acting as conductor for 12 of them), and he succeeded in the difficult task of reviving the Festival in 1920 after a suspension of six years.

With his friend Edward Elgar he prepared what quickly became the standard edition of Bach's St. Matthew Passion. In 1904 Elgar dedicated the third of his Pomp and Circumstance Marches to him. Atkins also collaborated with Elgar on the cantata Hymn of Faith, which Atkins composed for the 1905 Three Choirs Festival in Worcester. Elgar prepared the text for him from the scriptures and took a great interest in its composition. It was revived in October 1995 at Worcester Cathedral and played by the BBC Philharmonic Orchestra and the Worcester Festival Choral Society, conducted by Donald Hunt. A BBC recording exists. And it was Atkins who later suggested that Elgar's Severn Suite—produced in 1930 as a brass band competition piece, and arranged for orchestra in 1932—should be transcribed for organ; Elgar suggested that Atkins do the arrangement himself. The resulting work—on which Elgar and Atkins worked together—was completed in 1932 and published as Elgar's 'Second Organ Sonata'.

Other compositions included a Magnificat and Nunc dimittis in G (which has been recorded by the Choir of Worcester Cathedral), the anthem If Ye then be Risen with Christ (published Novello, 1904), the Chorale Prelude on the tune 'Worcester''' (published 1924) and songs such as The Shepherdess, The Years at the Spring, and Elleen, in Victorian ballad style. He was knighted in 1921 for services to music and was President of the Royal College of Organists from 1935 to 1936.

Atkins married Katherine Butler in 1899. Katherine became Mayor of Worcester in 1937. She died in 1954. Their ashes were interred in Worcester Cathedral. Their son, Edward Wulstan Ivor Atkins (1904-2003) was an engineer and writer. He was Elgar's godson and wrote The Elgar/Atkins Friendship'' in 1984. Ivor Atkins’ students included composer Florence Margaret Spencer Palmer.

References

External links
 
 National Portrait Gallery
 Worcester Chorale Prelude, performed by Peter Dyke, Lammas Records (2007)
 

1869 births
1953 deaths
Welsh classical organists
British male organists
Cathedral organists
Alumni of The Queen's College, Oxford
Knights Bachelor
Conductors (music) awarded knighthoods
Musicians awarded knighthoods
People from Llandaff
Male classical organists